Strip Search is a drama film made for the HBO network, first aired on April 27, 2004. The film explores the status of individual liberties in the aftermath of the September 11, 2001 attacks and the approval of the USA PATRIOT Act. The film was directed by Sidney Lumet and written by Oz creator Tom Fontana. It stars Glenn Close, Maggie Gyllenhaal, Ken Leung, Bruno Lastra and Dean Winters. The film initially was screened at the Monaco International Film Festival with Lumet presenting it in the presence of Fontana.

Different cuts of the film exist. There is supposedly a two-hour version. German TV showed an 86-minute version. The version released on DVD in the U.S. is 56 minutes.

Plot
The film is built around two main parallel stories, each containing almost identical dialogues. One story line involves Linda Sykes (Gyllenhaal), an American woman detained in the People's Republic of China, being interrogated by a military officer (Leung). In the other storyline, Sharif Bin Said (Lastra), an Arab man detained in New York City, is interrogated by two FBI agents (Winters and Close). Both characters are graduate students detained with no hard evidence and interrogated about unspecified activities which may or may not be related to terrorist plots.

In the course of the increasingly brutal interrogations, both Sykes and Bin Said are strip searched against their will by their interrogators and are subjected to a cavity search. In both cases the protagonists appear to have only tenuous connections with the suspected terrorist plots.

The film ends with the question: "Must security and safety come at the price of freedom?"

Cast 
Glenn Close as Karen Moore
Maggie Gyllenhaal as Linda Sykes
Ken Leung as Liu Tsung-Yuan
Bruno Lastra as Sharif Bin Said
Dean Winters as Ned McGrath
Peter Jacobson as John Scanlon
Austin Pendleton as James Perley
Tom Guiry as Gerry Sykes
Fred Kohler as Jimmy Briggs
Christopher McCann as Nicholas Hudson
Nelson Lee as Xiu-Juan Chang
Ramsey Faragallah as Abdul Amin
Daniel May Wong as Arresting Officer

References

External links 
 
 
 Strip Search DVD on Amazon.com

2004 television films
American political drama films
2004 drama films
2004 films
Films shot in New Jersey
War on terror
Films directed by Sidney Lumet
HBO Films films
2000s American films